Harana may refer to:

Harana/Valle de Arana a municipality in the autonomous community of Basque Country, northern Spain
Harana, Rajgarh, a village in Madhya Pradesh, India
Sierra Harana mountain range in the center of the province of Granada, southern Spain
Harana Halli (Kannada:ಹಾರನಹಳ್ಳಿ)  village in the southern state of Karnataka, India
the Philippine spelling of the Spanish jarana
Harana (band), Philippines band founded in 2015
Harana (serenade), traditional serenade in the Philippines
Harana (elopement), capturing a girl to marry her in Hindu legend
Harana (genus), a genus of land planarians in the subfamily Geoplaninae